The Way Down is a 2021 American documentary television miniseries directed and produced by Marina Zenovich. It follows Gwen Shamblin Lara, the founder of a diet program Weigh Down Workshop, and The Remnant Fellowship, a new Christian group led by Shamblin Lara. It consists of 5 episodes and premiered with the first three on HBO Max on September 30, 2021, with the last two premiering on April 28, 2022.

Plot
The series follows Gwen Shamblin Lara, the founder of a diet program Weigh Down Workshop, and The Remnant Fellowship, a church founded by Shamblin Lara.

Episodes

Production
Nile Cappello began researching Gwen Shamblin Lara and The Remnant Fellowship, spending months getting to know former members. Cappello brought the project to Campfire, who agreed to produce the series, and asked Marina Zenovich to direct.

The producers had reached out to Gwen Shamblin Lara and The Remnant Fellowship for an interview, but all declined. However, the church posted a response to the miniseries on the RemnantFellowship.org website. During the final stages of post-production on the series, Gwen Shamblin Lara died in a plane crash. Afterward, people who had been unwilling to speak about their experiences with Shamblin Lara and The Remnant Fellowship reached out to Zenovich.

References

External links
 

HBO Max original programming
Television series about cults
True crime television series
2020s American documentary television series
2021 American television series debuts
2022 American television series endings
English-language television shows